Hayrettinköy (also: Hayrettin) is a village in the Merzifon District, Amasya Province, Turkey. Its population is 132 (2021).

References

Villages in Merzifon District